Josep Maria "Pepe" Martí Sobrepera (born 13 June 2005) is a Spanish racing driver who currently competes in the FIA Formula 3 for Campos Racing. He is a race winner in the UAE and Spanish Formula 4 championships, and also the 2022 Formula Regional Asian Championship runner-up.

Career

Karting 
Martí started karting competitively in late 2016 at the age of eleven. In 2018 he was signed by Tony Kart, and the following year he won the Spanish Karting Championship in the Junior category, driving for Fernando Alonso's team. He then went on to finish 7th in the OK class of the CIK-FIA Karting World Championship in 2020, his last year of karting, with Kart Republic.

Formula 4 
Martí made his single-seater debut in January 2021, driving for Xcel Motorsport in the Formula 4 UAE Championship. He won a single race at the Yas Marina Circuit and came 7th in the standings, 184 points behind champion Enzo Trulli. For the main season, he competed in Spanish F4 with Campos Racing, as the Valencian team made its debut in the championship. He won two races at MotorLand Aragón and held a season-long fight for runner-up spot with teammate Sebastian Øgaard, ultimately finishing 3rd behind eventual champion Dilano van 't Hoff and Øgaard.

Formula Regional

2022 
Martí started 2022 racing in the rebranded Formula Regional Asian Championship for Irish-Filipino team Pinnacle Motorsport, alongside Formula 4 rival Van 't Hoff. He got five podiums and 158 points from 15 races to claim second place in the overall standings, while also winning the rookie cup.

2023 
During 2023 pre-season, Martí returned to the 2023 Formula Regional Middle East Championship with Pinnacle Van Amersfoort Racing.

FIA Formula 3

2022 
After testing for the team in 2021 post-season, Martí made the step up to the FIA Formula 3 Championship in 2022 with Campos Racing. Martí had a disappointing season, but in Imola during the feature race, he made a strategy gamble to stay on the wets on a drying track, and led the race for a number of laps before pitting for slicks. He finished the race in 15th. He scored his first points finish in the final round at Monza in the Sprint Race, where he finished 9th. He ended the season 26th in the standings with 2 points, ahead of teammate Hunter Yeany but far from other teammate and fellow countryman David Vidales. At the end of the season, Martí took part in the post-season test, remaining with Campos.

2023 
Martí continued with Campos Racing for the 2023 Formula 3 season.

Sportscar racing 
Martí made his sportscar and prototype debut at the 2022 Historic Zandvoort Grand Prix competing in the Masters Endurance Legends, organised by Masters Historic Racing, in a Duqueine-run Norma M30. He won both races in his G2/P3 class and finished on the overall podium against higher class machinery in race 1.

Formula One 
In September 2022, Martí was announced to join two time Formula One champion Fernando Alonso's management team.

Karting record

Karting career summary

Racing record

Racing career summary 

* Season still in progress.

Complete Formula 4 UAE Championship results 
(key) (Races in bold indicate pole position) (Races in italics indicate fastest lap)

Complete F4 Spanish Championship results 
(key) (Races in bold indicate pole position) (Races in italics indicate fastest lap)

Complete Formula Regional Asian Championship results
(key) (Races in bold indicate pole position) (Races in italics indicate the fastest lap of top ten finishers)

Complete Formula Regional Middle East Championship results
(key) (Races in bold indicate pole position) (Races in italics indicate fastest lap)

* Season still in progress.

Complete FIA Formula 3 Championship results 
(key) (Races in bold indicate pole position; races in italics indicate points for the fastest lap of top ten finishers)

† Driver did not finish the race, but was classified as they completed more than 90% of the race distance.

References

External links 
 
 

Living people
2005 births
Spanish racing drivers
Spanish F4 Championship drivers
FIA Formula 3 Championship drivers
Campos Racing drivers
Pinnacle Motorsport drivers
Formula Regional Asian Championship drivers
Karting World Championship drivers
Van Amersfoort Racing drivers
UAE F4 Championship drivers
Formula Regional Middle East Championship drivers